Clonmoyle West is a townland within both the civil parish and catholic parish of Aghabullogue, County Cork, Ireland. It is 774.06 acres in size, situate east of Aghabullogue village, and north-west of Coachford village.

It is referred to as 'Clonmoile' in the Down Survey (Muskerry) map, and 'Clonmolye' with arable and course pasture land in the Down Survey (Parishes of Ahabollog and Aghinagh) map, with the terrier naming the proprietor as an Irish papist, Cormack MacCallaghan Carthy of the 'denomination of Clonmoyle', consisting of three ploughlands and c. 1521 acres considered 'entirely profitable'. The present combined acreage of Clonmoyle West with the adjoining townland of Clonmoyle East is c. 1530 acres.

The Ordnance Survey name book (c. 1840) describes the townland as situated in the east of Aghabullogue parish about seven miles east-north-east of Macroom. It was said to be the property of 'Chas (S) Oliver, Esqre', and of mixed quality, good and inferior, partially cultivated, and with much boggy land. Two 'Danish forts' (ringforts) were located in the townland. Local placenames included the Dele[h]inagh River, Shanavough, Clonmoyle Racecourse and Ballinadihy Bridge. The mid-nineteenth century Primary Land Valuation (Griffith's Valuation) indicates 'Silver Charles Oliver' as the immediate lessor of c. 662 acres in Clonmoyle West, being approximately 86% of the entire townland area.

A number of interpretations of 'Clonmoyle' can be found. The Ordnance Survey name book (c. 1840) suggests an Irish language version of Cluain Maoile meaning 'meadow of the hornless cow'. O'Donoghue (1986) suggests an Irish version of Cluain Mhaoil, meaning 'bare or bleak watershed', or possibly Cluain Maothaile meaning 'soft or spongy watershed'.  O'Murchú (1991) suggests Cluain Mhaol as meaning 'the bare meadow'.  The Placenames Database of Ireland gives an Irish name of Cluain Maol Thiar to the townland, with cluain meaning 'meadow' or 'pasture', and maol meaning 'bare' or 'flat-topped hillock', .

At the northern end of the townland is an area known as 'Shanavough'. The OS name book describes it as a sub-denomination of Clonmoyle West and 'situated in the north-west part of the townland ... about 50 chains north from Aghabologue Chapel'. O'Donoghue (1986) describes Shanavough as located in the northern end of the townland, and suggests an Irish version of Seana Mhacha, meaning 'old enclosure or milking place'.

Townlands vary greatly in size, being territorial divisions within parishes in Ireland. Extensively used for land surveys, censuses and polling systems since the seventeenth century, townlands have also been used as the basis for rural postal addresses. In County Cork, surveying and standardisation of townland names and boundaries by the Ordnance Survey during the mid-nineteenth century, resulted in some earlier townland names disappearing, due to amalgamation or division. The townlands resulting from such surveys were employed during the Primary Land Valuation (Griffith's Valuation), subsequent censuses, and continue in use today.

Sites of interest
Clonmoyle Racecourse
Ballinadihy Bridge
Aghabullogue Bridge

References

External links
1841 surveyed OS map (maps.osi.ie)
1901 surveyed OS map (maps.osi.ie)
acrheritage.info

Townlands of County Cork